Union of Slovak Partisans was a veterans' organization for former Slovak partisans. It was eventually taken over by the Communist Party of Czechoslovakia and operated as a pro-Communist armed group during the 1947 Slovak political crisis and the 1948 Czechoslovak coup d'état.

References

Slovak partisans
Veterans' organizations